Events in the year 1852 in India.

Events
 2nd Burma War.

Law
Colonial Bishops Act (British statute)

References

 
India
Years of the 19th century in India